In Hearing of is the third album by British rock band Atomic Rooster. Although not included on the album, the "Devil's Answer" single was released just prior to it, becoming the band's highest chart success at number 4 in the UK. This helped push the album to a number 18 UK chart placing, despite the fact that the four musicians pictured on the inside cover never played together. Half of the songs were written by Crane along with his first wife, Pat Darnell, who assisted with the lyrics. The backing tracks (and some vocals) were recorded by Vincent Crane, John Cann and Paul Hammond, but Cann and Hammond were let go from the group soon after vocalist Pete French was drafted in.  The finished album's sound was dominated by Crane and Hammond, with many of Cann's guitar parts either not used or placed lower in the mix.  However, Cann's guitar does still come through loud and clear on his compositions (tracks 2 and 6) and the instrumentals (tracks 4 and 7).

The album reached #45 in Canada.

Track listing

Original version
Side one
 "Breakthrough" (Vincent Crane, Pat Darnell) 6:18
 "Break the Ice" (John Cann) 4:59
 "Decision/Indecision" (Crane, Darnell) 3:50
 "A Spoonful of Bromide Helps the Pulse Rate Go Down" (Crane) 4:38
Side two
 "Black Snake" (Crane, Darnell) 6:00
 "Head in the Sky" (Cann) 5:38 
 "The Rock" (Crane) 4:31
 "The Price" (Crane, Darnell) 5:16

Original U.S. Version
Side one
 "Breakthrough"
 "Break the Ice"
 "Decision/Indecision"
 "A Spoonful of Bromide Helps the Pulse Rate Go Down"
 "Devil's Answer" - U.S. Version with Pete French Overdubbed Vocals

Side two
 "Black Snake"
 "Head in the Sky"
 "The Rock"
 "The Price"

1990 (and 1995 remastered Digipack) Repertoire Records CD reissue bonus track
 "Devil's Answer" (Cann) 3.28 - original single version 1971

2004 Castle Music CD reissue bonus tracks
 "Devil's Answer" (Cann) 3:28 - US version with overdubbed Pete French vocals 1971
 "Breakthrough" 7:20 - Live in Concert 1972
 "A Spoonful of Bromide Helps the Pulse Rate Go Down" 4:46 - Live in Concert 1972

2001 Akarma Records unlicensed CD reissue bonus tracks
 "Devil's Answer" (Cann) 3.28 - original single version 1971
 "Breakthrough" (Crane, Darnell) 6:10 - Live in Concert 1972
 "Stand by Me" (Crane) 4:57 - as above
 "People You Can't Trust" (Crane) 4:29 - as above
 "All in Satan's Name" (Ric Parnell) 3:56 - as above
 "Devil's Answer" (Cann) 5:39 - as above

Personnel 
Atomic Rooster
 Vincent Crane - Hammond organ, keyboard bass (all tracks), piano (1, 3, 4), vocals (5, 8) 
 John Cann - guitars (all but 3)
 Pete French - vocals (1-3, 6, 8)
 Paul Hammond - drums, percussion (all tracks)

Personnel (North American Tour, 1971) 
 Vincent Crane: Hammond organ, electric piano, keyboard bass
 Pete French: vocals
 Steve Bolton: guitar
 Ric Parnell: drums

References 

The New Musical Express Book of Rock, 1975, Star Books, 

Atomic Rooster albums
1971 albums
Albums with cover art by Roger Dean (artist)
Elektra Records albums
Castle Communications albums
Albums produced by Vincent Crane
Albums produced by John Du Cann
Philips Records albums
Repertoire Records albums